De Dans van de Reiger  is a 1966 Dutch film directed by Fons Rademakers. It was adapted by Hugo Claus from his play of the same name.

Plot
The rich and conservative Edward can not forgive his younger wife who had been unfaithful. She's trying to get his attention by flirting with a Dutch tourist.

Cast
Gunnel Lindblom as Elena

Jean Desailly as Edouard

Van Doude as Paul, Nederlandse tourist

Mien Duymaer Van Twist as Moeder van Edouard

Jan Teulings as Vader van Edouard

Kitty Janssen as Moeder van Edouard (jong)

Manfred de Graaf as Manfred de Graaf

1966 films
Dutch black-and-white films
1960s Dutch-language films